Edward Jackson Sanford (November 23, 1831 – October 27, 1902) was an American manufacturing tycoon and financier, active primarily in Knoxville, Tennessee, in the late 19th century.  As president or vice president of two banks and more than a half-dozen companies, Sanford helped finance Knoxville's post-Civil War industrial boom, and was involved in nearly every major industry operating in the city during this period. Companies he led during his career included Sanford, Chamberlain and Albers, Mechanics' National Bank, Knoxville Woolen Mills, and the Coal Creek Coal Mining and Manufacturing Company.

Biography

Early life

Sanford was born in Redding, Fairfield County, Connecticut, in 1831.  He was trained as a carpenter, and moved to Knoxville at the age of 22 to work in this trade.  He initially worked for Shepard, Leeds and Hoyts, which built railroad cars.  Later in the decade, he cofounded a lumber and construction company.  Although many people fled Knoxville during the city's cholera outbreak of 1854, Sanford stayed behind to help care for the sick and dying.

At the outset of the Civil War in November 1861, Sanford helped fellow Unionist William Rule sneak out of Confederate-occupied Knoxville to carry messages to newspaper editor William G. Brownlow, who was in hiding in the mountains.  In 1862, Sanford fled to Kentucky to join the Union Army, but fell ill before he could enlist (Sanford's account of his escape to Kentucky was later published as an appendix in Thomas William Humes's The Loyal Mountaineers of Tennessee).  He returned to Knoxville following Burnside's capture of the city in late 1863.  Sanford fought at the Battle of Fort Sanders on November 29, 1863, and years later, provided historian Oliver Perry Temple with an account of the battle for Temple's book, East Tennessee and the Civil War.

Business interests

Toward the end of the war in 1864, Sanford formed a drug company, E.J. Sanford and Company.  In 1872, this company consolidated with a business established by Hiram Chamberlain and A.J. Albers, to form Sanford, Chamberlain and Albers.  In subsequent years, this new company grew to become one of the largest pharmaceutical companies in the South.

This company in turn leased the land to various mining firms, most notably the Knoxville Iron Company and the Tennessee Coal Mining Company (TCMC). In 1891, an uprising known as the Coal Creek War erupted when the latter attempted to replace its free miners with convict laborers. While Sanford blamed a "fool contract" made by TCMC president B.A. Jenkins for the uprising, he nevertheless supported the use of convict labor as a means to keep regional coal companies competitive.

In 1882, Sanford helped organize the Mechanics' National Bank, and initially served as the bank's vice president.  In October of that same year, however, the bank's first president, Thomas O'Connor, was killed in a notorious shootout in Downtown Knoxville.  Sanford served as an interim president until Samuel B. Luttrell was elected president of the bank in 1883.

During the late 1880s, Sanford became enamored with social theories regarding the development of planned cities, where company workers could live free from the vices that plagued large cities.  In 1889, he and his long-time associate, Charles McClung McGhee, founded the Lenoir City Company with plans to establish such a town.  The company purchased the Lenoir estate in Loudon County and platted what is now Lenoir City in 1890.  While the Panic of 1893 seriously stunted the new city's growth, the city survived, and today, part of the city still follows the Lenoir City Company's early-1890s grid.

During the 1880s and 1890s, Sanford served as president of the Knoxville Woolen Mills, which under his leadership had grown to become Knoxville's largest textile firm by 1900.  During this same period, he served as a director of several other companies, including the East Tennessee, Virginia and Georgia Railway, the Knoxville Brick Company, and the Knoxville Iron Company.  In 1898, Sanford purchased both the Knoxville Journal and the Knoxville Tribune, and combined the two into a single newspaper.  He retained his old Civil War-era associate, William Rule, as the paper's editor.

Death and legacy

Sanford died at his home in Knoxville on October 27, 1902.  He is interred in Old Gray Cemetery.  The company he cofounded, Sanford, Chamberlain and Albers, continued operating in Knoxville as Albers, Inc., until 1994.  The company's former store and office at 430 South Gay Street still stands, and is a contributing property in the National Register of Historic Places-listed Gay Street Commercial Historic District.  Maplehurst Park, an apartment complex in Downtown Knoxville, is named for Sanford's mansion, Maplehurst, which once stood on the property.

Sanford was a lifelong advocate for education in Knoxville.  In 1869, working as an agent for East Tennessee University (now the University of Tennessee), he helped secure for the institution the state's Morrill Act (land-grant) funds.  During the same period, he advocated the establishment of a public school system in Knoxville, and served as the president of the city's Board of Education in the early 1880s.

Sanford's son, Edward Terry Sanford (1865–1930), was a prominent Knoxville attorney who served as an associate justice of the United States Supreme Court from 1923 until 1930.  Another son, Alfred (1875–1946), continued publishing the Knoxville Journal until 1928, when he sold the paper to senator and publisher, Luke Lea.  Sanford's son, Hugh (1879–1961), was a Knoxville-area iron manufacturer who advised the War Industries Board and the Council of National Defense during World War I.

See also
Eldad Cicero Camp

References

External links
Sanford family, 1886 — portrait of Edward J. Sanford and family on file at the Calvin M. McClung Historical Collection

1831 births
1902 deaths
People from Knoxville, Tennessee
People from Fairfield County, Connecticut
Businesspeople from Tennessee
American businesspeople in the coal industry
Tennessee Republicans
Southern Unionists in the American Civil War
Sanford family
19th-century American businesspeople